Manuel Francisco Morales (July 23, 1919 – November 12, 2009) was a Honduran-born American biophysicist who did pivotal research on the molecular basis of muscle contraction.

Scientific career
In the 1950s at the Naval Medical Research Institute, Morales and Terrell Hill showed that the high energy of the terminal phosphate bond in ATP was due to electrostatic repulsion between the three phosphate groups, and he and Richard Podolsky measured the heat of hydrolysis for ATP cleavage, the fundamental energy currency of biological metabolism.

Awards and service
Morales was elected a member of the US National Academy of Sciences and awarded the Order of the Rising Sun (Japan). He served as president of the Biophysical Society for 1968–69, and was the founding editor of the Annual Review of Biophysics.

Key publications
Hill TL, Morales MF. (1951) On "High Energy Phosphate Bonds" of Biochemical Interest. Journal of the American Chemical Society 73: 1656–1660
Botts J, Morales MF (1953) Analytical description of the effects of modifiers and of enzyme multivalency upon  the steady state catalyzed reaction rate, Trans. Faraday Soc., 49(6), 696–6707
Podolsky RJ, Morales MF. (1956) The Enthalpy Change of Adenosine Triphosphate Hydrolysis Journal of Biological Chemistry 218: 945–959 (pdf)
Mendelson RA, Morales MF, Botts J. (1973) Segmental flexibility of the S-1 moiety of myosin. Biochemistry 12: 2250–2255
Morales MF, Botts J. (1979) On the molecular basis for chemomechanical energy transduction in muscle. Proceedings of the National Academy of Sciences USA 76: 3857–3859
Botts J, Takashi R, Torgerson P, Hozumi T, Muhlrad A, D Mornet D, Morales MF. (1984) On the mechanism of energy transduction in myosin subfragment 1. Proceedings of the National Academy of Sciences USA 81: 2060–2064
Botts J, Thomason JF, Morales MF. (1989) On the origin and transmission of force in actomyosin subfragment 1. Proceedings of the National Academy of Sciences USA 86: 2204–2208
Onishi H, Mochizuki N, Morales MF. (2004) On the Myosin Catalysis of ATP Hydrolysis. Biochemistry 43: 3757–3763

References

American biophysicists
Members of the United States National Academy of Sciences
1919 births
2009 deaths
Honduran emigrants to the United States
Harvard Medical School alumni
University of California, Berkeley alumni
Annual Reviews (publisher) editors
Presidents of the Biophysical Society